Sarah-Jeanne Labrosse (born August 16, 1991) is a Canadian actress from Quebec, most noted for her leading role as Donalda in the 2016-2021 television drama series Les Pays d'en haut. The role garnered her a Gémeaux Award nomination for Best Actress in a Drama Series in 2017, and an Artis Awards for Best Actress in a Drama Series in 2019.

Filmography

Film

Television

References

External links

Canadian child actresses
Canadian film actresses
Canadian television actresses
Canadian voice actresses
French Quebecers
Living people
20th-century Canadian actresses
21st-century Canadian actresses
Actresses from Montreal
1991 births